Smyth County is a county located in the U.S. state of Virginia. As of the 2020 census, the population was 29,800. Its county seat is Marion.

History
Smyth County was formed on February 23, 1832, from Washington and Wythe counties. The county is named after Alexander Smyth, a general during the War of 1812 who was elected to the state Senate, House of Delegates, and as a Representative to the United States Congress.

Geography

Adjacent counties
 Russell County – northwest
 Tazewell County – north
 Bland County – northeast
 Wythe County – east
 Grayson County – south
 Washington County – southwest

National protected areas
 Jefferson National Forest (part)
 Mount Rogers National Recreation Area (part)

Major highways

Demographics

2020 census

Note: the US Census treats Hispanic/Latino as an ethnic category. This table excludes Latinos from the racial categories and assigns them to a separate category. Hispanics/Latinos can be of any race.

2000 Census
As of the census of 2000, there were 33,081 people, 13,493 households, and 9,607 families residing in the county. There were 15,111 housing units at an average density of 33 per square mile (13/km2). The racial makeup of the county was 96.86% White, 1.87% Black or African American, 0.15% Native American, 0.18% Asian, 0.32% from other races, and 0.60% from two or more races. 0.86% of the population were Hispanic or Latino of any race.

There were 13,493 households, out of which 29.20% had children under the age of 18 living with them, 55.70% were married couples living together, 11.20% had a female householder with no husband present, and 28.80% were non-families. 26.00% of all households were made up of individuals, and 12.50% had someone living alone who was 65 years of age or older. The average household size was 2.37 and the average family size was 2.83.

In the county, the population was spread out, with 21.60% under the age of 18, 8.00% from 18 to 24, 28.10% from 25 to 44, 26.00% from 45 to 64, and 16.30% who were 65 years of age or older. The median age was 40 years. For every 100 females there were 93.80 males. For every 100 females age 18 and over, there were 90.50 males.

The median income for a household in the county was $30,083, and the median income for a family was $36,392. Males had a median income of $26,698 versus $19,712 for females. The per capita income for the county was $16,105. About 9.90% of families and 13.30% of the population were below the poverty line, including 15.20% of those under age 18 and 14.00% of those age 65 or over.

Tourism
The Smyth County Tourism Association was formed in April 2006 to promote sustainable tourism development and manages the operation of the state-certified H.L. Bonham Regional Development and Tourism Center. The organization markets the area through www.VisitVirginiaMountains.com

Education

Public high schools 
 Chilhowie High School, Chilhowie
 Marion Senior High School, Marion
 Northwood High School, Saltville

Communities

Towns
 Chilhowie
 Marion
 Saltville (partly in Washington County)

Census-designated places
 Adwolfe
 Atkins
 McMullin
 Seven Mile Ford
 Sugar Grove

Other unincorporated communities
 Groseclose
 Rich Valley

Politics

See also
 National Register of Historic Places listings in Smyth County, Virginia

References

 
Virginia counties
1832 establishments in Virginia
Populated places established in 1832
Counties of Appalachia